Baschi is a comune (municipality) in the Province of Terni in the Italian region Umbria, located about 50 km southwest of Perugia and about 35 km northwest of Terni.

References

Cities and towns in Umbria